The 1981 Tour de France was the 68th edition of Tour de France, one of cycling's Grand Tours. The Tour began in Nice with a prologue individual time trial on 25 June and Stage 12a occurred on 8 July with a flat stage from Roubaix. The race finished on the Champs-Élysées in Paris on 19 July.

Stage 12a
8 July 1981 — Roubaix to Brussels,

Stage 12b
8 July 1981 — Brussels (Belgium) to Circuit Zolder (Belgium),

Stage 13
9 July 1981 — Beringen (Belgium) to Hasselt (Belgium),

Stage 14
10 July 1981 — Mulhouse,  (individual time trial)

Stage 15
11 July 1981 — Besançon to Thonon-les-Bains,

Stage 16
12 July 1981 — Thonon-les-Bains to Morzine,

Stage 17
14 July 1981 — Morzine to Alpe d'Huez,

Stage 18
15 July 1981 — Le Bourg-d'Oisans to Le Pleynet,

Stage 19
16 July 1981 — Veurey to Saint-Priest,

Stage 20
17 July 1981 — Saint-Priest,  (individual time trial)

Stage 21
18 July 1981 — Auxerre to Fontenay-sous-Bois,

Stage 22
19 July 1981 — Fontenay-sous-Bois to Paris Champs-Élysées,

See also
1981 Tour de France, Prologue to Stage 11

References

1981 Tour de France
Tour de France stages